Doleromyrma rottnestensis is a species of ant in the genus Doleromyrma. Described by William Morton Wheeler in 1934, the species is endemic to Australia.

References

Dolichoderinae
Insects described in 1934
Hymenoptera of Australia